Patan is a municipality in Baitadi District in the Mahakali Zone in Sudurpaschim Province of Far-western Nepal. The new municipality was formed by merging six existing villages Sakar, Silanga, Bhumeswor Gujar Basantapur and Patan on 2 December 2014. The office of the municipality is that of the former Patan village development committee.

Population
Patan municipality is formed by merging Sakar,Silanga, Bhumeswor Gujar, Basantapur and Patan. It has a total population of 19,911 according to[2011 Nepal census].

Introduction
Patan is beautiful place overall of the district. This place is surrounded by the beautiful hills including pine forests. At the bottom of this village there is Surnaya river is streaming which is main river of this area. This place is located in between Dadeldhura And Baitadi Khalanga. In this municipality many District level governmental offices are situated like Children or Woman development office, District Animal care office, District irrigation office, District landslide rescue office, District Family planning association of Nepal and many other offices. In this area it has Hydro power about of 250 Kilowatt power which provides Electricity within its area. Climate is medium (nor very hot neither very cool) it belongs to mid hill region. Mainly in this area Brahmin, Chhetri and Thakuri peoples are living. Mainly people of this area depends on Agriculture but other occupation is also income source.

References

See also

Populated places in Baitadi District
Municipalities in Baitadi District